Jamal Davis II (born July 9, 1995) is an American professional gridiron football defensive lineman for the Montreal Alouettes of the Canadian Football League (CFL). He has also been a member of five different teams in the National Football League (NFL); the Houston Texans, Indianapolis Colts, Miami Dolphins, Tennessee Titans, Cleveland Browns and Los Angeles Chargers. He played college football at the University of Akron.

High school 
Davis attended Canton McKinley High School.

College career 
Davis played college football for the Akron Zips but sat out the 2016 season, as per NCAA transfer rules. Davis started in 12 games his junior season, earning him third-team All-MAC honors. He had 69 tackles, 15.5 for loss, and two sacks in 14 games (12 starts). Jamal participated in the 2019 NFL Combine.

Professional career

Houston Texans 
In April 2019, Davis signed as an undrafted free agent with the Houston Texans (NFL). In July 2019, Davis was moved to the active roster. In September 2019, Davis was released by the Texans.

Indianapolis Colts 
Davis signed to the practice squad with the Indianapolis Colts (NFL) on September 2, 2019.

Miami Dolphins 
In December 2019, Davis signed with the Miami Dolphins (NFL). Davis made his NFL debut with the Dolphins and played in three games for the team in 2019.

Tennessee Titans 
In August 2020, Davis signed with the Tennessee Titans (NFL).

Cleveland Browns 
In December 2020, Davis signed with the Cleveland Browns (NFL) to the practice squad.

Montreal Alouettes 
Davis signed with the Montreal Alouettes of the Canadian Football League (CFL) in January 2021. Davis made his debut with Montreal on September 3, 2021. He played in nine games for the Alouettes during the 2021 season and contributed with 17 defensive tackles, four quarterback sacks and a touchdown.

Los Angeles Chargers 
On January 25, 2022, the Los Angeles Chargers signed Davis to a reserve/future contract. He was waived on August 30, 2022.

Montreal Alouettes (II) 
On September 16, 2022, it was announced that Davis had re-signed with the Montreal Alouettes on a two-year contract. He played in six regular season games where he had ten defensive tackles, two sacks, and one forced fumble.

References

External links
Montreal Alouettes bio

1995 births
Living people
Los Angeles Chargers players
Miami Dolphins players
Montreal Alouettes players